"Sacrifice" is a song by Canadian singer the Weeknd. It was released on January 7, 2022, through XO and Republic Records, as the second single from his fifth studio album Dawn FM. The song was written by the Weeknd, Max Martin, Oscar Holter, Carl Nordström and Swedish House Mafia; with Kevin McCord receiving songwriting credits for the sampling of the 1981 track "I Want to Thank You", performed by Alicia Myers. Production was handled by the Weeknd, Martin, Holter and Swedish House Mafia.

Background and promotion
At the end of the Weeknd's music video for Dawn FM's lead single "Take My Breath", a snippet of "Sacrifice" is heard. It was released alongside its parent album on January 7, 2022, and was sent to American contemporary hit radio stations on January 11 as the second single from the album.

Lyrics and composition
"Sacrifice" has been described by music critics as a post-disco and electro-funk track that details the Weeknd's hedonistic lifestyle.

Critical reception  
Critics noted "Sacrifice" as being a standout track from the album, with the Weeknd's vocals and production being highlighted. Mankaprr Conteh from Rolling Stone compared the Weeknd's performance on the song to that of Michael Jackson's on his 1983 single "Wanna Be Startin' Somethin'" and his 1979 single "Don't Stop 'Til You Get Enough", putting emphasis on the similar sounding vocal melodies and guitar riffs. Heran Mamo of Billboard agreed, adding that the song is "the closest thing to a Michael Jackson record in the 21st century," claiming that it "resurrects the period-appropriate disco-funk". Mary Siroky in her review for Consequence of Sound highlighted that the song "is more of the irresistible fare for which The Weeknd has become known", praising his "wavy vocals" that "sound right at home here" and the production for being "bouncy and bright, making 'Sacrifice' stand out in an album packed with earworms."

The song won the Juno Award for Single of the Year at the Juno Awards of 2023.

Music video 
The music video for "Sacrifice", directed by Cliqua, was released alongside the song and parent album on January 7, 2022, and serves as the sequel to the music video of "Take My Breath". It begins with the Weeknd, who is dazed and confused, being brought towards a theoretical light at the end of a tunnel; while a snippet of Dawn FM's title track, featuring narration by actor Jim Carrey, is played in the background. He then wakes up out of breath as a result of the events that occurred in the "Take My Breath" music video. As he tries to catch his breath, he is abducted by a hooded cult and tied to a wheel-like contraption to be used for a human sacrifice. As the cult members gather around him, a veiled female figure in a red cloak appears and takes his soul away. A series of psychedelic-hued visuals, strobe lighting and dance numbers are then showcased. The Weeknd is then seen singing into a microphone while holding the stand with metal gauntlets. As the sacrifice continues, his hands become horrifically scarred, with the red-cloaked female having stolen his youth. The Weeknd is then seen giving his own variation of Michael Jackson's foot shuffle before the cult members disperse and The Weeknd tumbles out in a fading shot.

Credits and personnel
 The Weeknd – vocals, songwriting, production, programming, keyboards
 Max Martin – songwriting, production, programming, keyboards
 Oscar Holter – songwriting, production, programming, keyboards
 Swedish House Mafia – production
 Axel Hedfors – songwriting
 Steve Angello – songwriting
 Sebastian Ingrosso – songwriting
 Carl Nordström – songwriting
 Kevin Duane McCord – songwriting
 Serban Ghenea – mixing
 John Hanes – mix engineering
 Dave Kutch – mastering
 Kevin Peterson – assistant mixing
 Shin Kamiyama – engineering

Charts

Weekly charts

Year-end charts

Certifications

Release history

References

2022 singles
2022 songs
Republic Records singles
Songs written by the Weeknd
The Weeknd songs
Songs written by Axwell
Songs written by Sebastian Ingrosso
Songs written by Steve Angello
Song recordings produced by the Weeknd
Song recordings produced by Max Martin
Songs written by Oneohtrix Point Never
Post-disco songs
Electro songs
Juno Award for Single of the Year singles